Piptoporus is a genus of bracket fungi in the Fomitopsidaceae family.

Species
Various species formerly classified as Piptoporus (for example, P. choseniae, P. fraxineus,  P. ulmi, P. hirtus, and P. elatinus) have been renamed or moved into other genera.

Piptoporus australiensis (Wakef.) G. Cunn.
Piptoporus betulinus (Bull.) P. Karst. (1881)
Piptoporus quercinus (Schrad.) P. Karst. (1881) (moved to Buglossoporus)
Piptoporus soloniensis (Dubois) Pilát (1937)
Piptoporus suberosus (L.) Murrill (1903)

References

External links

Fomitopsidaceae
Polyporales genera
Taxa described in 1881